David Crabtree is an American television anchor, journalist. He is the lead news anchor for WRAL-TV in Raleigh, North Carolina.

Career 
Crabtree started out his career as a musician, playing drums professionally with bands in Nashville and doing session work for radio jingles, which led to a job as a radio disc jockey. He left radio to work as press secretary for the Tennessee House of Representatives.

Television career 
Crabtree started his television career as a reporter on Nashville’s WKRN-TV. He later worked at KCNC-TV and KMGH-TV in Denver, Colorado and WITN-TV in Washington, North Carolina. In 1994 he became a news anchor at WRAL-TV in Raleigh, North Carolina. Crabtree announced his retirement from WRAL in 2018 and was set to retire at the end of that year, but announced in November 2018 that he would postpone his retirement and continue working at WRAL until 2020. In April 2022, Crabtree was named as interim Chief Executive Officer (CEO) of PBS North Carolina.  In September 2022, Crabtree was appointed permanently as the CEO of PBS North Carolina.

Awards 
Crabtree has won 11 Emmy awards and has been named North Carolina Journalist of the Year four consecutive years by the Radio-Television News Directors Association of the Carolinas.  He has also received the Gabriel Award and Alfred I. duPont-Columbia University Award in 2007 for his documentary on living conditions for migrant workers in North Carolina. Crabtree won a Midsouth Emmy award for coverage of the 2010 Haiti earthquake Crabtree was nominated in 2011 for a Midsouth Emmy for coverage of the funeral for Elizabeth Edwards.

Crabtree was also inducted into the Order of the Long Leaf Pine. On the same day of his retirement from WRAL, May 25th 2022, which was deemed “David Crabtree day” in Raleigh by the Mayor at the time.

Ministerial Work 
Crabtree was ordained a deacon in the Episcopal Church in 2004. He served as an assisting minister at St. Michael's Episcopal Church in Raleigh from 2004 until 2018. Crabtree was permanently suspended from ministry by the Episcopal Diocese of North Carolina after allegations of sexual misconduct were made against him in October 2018. Crabtree made a personal statement explaining his removal from ministry, stating that he had engaged in a consensual relationship with a woman that violated church law.

Personal life 
Crabtree is from Nashville, Tennessee. He graduated with a bachelors of science from Middle Tennessee State University. He later studied divinity at Vanderbilt University and obtained a masters in theology from the Graduate Theological Foundation before enrolling as a masters student at Duke University's Divinity School. Crabtree is divorced and has two daughters.

References

Living people
21st-century American Episcopalians
21st-century American journalists
American Episcopal clergy
American male journalists
American television news anchors
21st-century Anglican deacons
Duke Divinity School alumni
Journalists from Tennessee
Middle Tennessee State University alumni
News & Documentary Emmy Award winners
People from Nashville, Tennessee
Vanderbilt University alumni
Year of birth missing (living people)
Graduate Theological Foundation alumni
21st-century American clergy